Štramberk is a town in Nový Jičín District in the Moravian-Silesian Region of the Czech Republic. It has about 3,500 inhabitants. The historic centre of Štramberk is well preserved and is protected by law as an urban monument reservation.

Geography

Štramberk lies in the Moravian-Silesian Foothills. The town is spread on the steep slopes of several hills.

The town is surrounded by several small-scale protected areas, including the national natural monument Šipka Cave. This karst cave is the oldest recorded human presence of the territory of the Czech Republic.

History
The first written mention of Štramberk is from 1211, when a village under the eponymous castle was documented. The origin and age of the castle are unknown. In 1359, the town of Štramberk was founded by John Henry, Margrave of Moravia on the site of the settlement. It obtained various privileges that helped its development.

From the 15th century, Štramberk was the centre of Moravian Church. In 1624, Štramberk was acquired by the Jesuits. During the Thirty Years' War, the town was attacked and devastated several times. The castle was severely damaged. In the 1783, the front part collapsed and the masonry was dismantled.

In the second half of the 19th century limestone mining began here, which started further economic growth. The railway was opened in 1881. Although Štramberk was completely Czech in terms of nationality, it was annexed by Nazi Germany in 1938–1945.

Economy

The town is known for its production of Štramberk ears, which is a traditional confectionery produced for about 800 years. The manufactory is protected geographical indication by the European Union and it was the first Czech product with this designation.

Sport
Every year, the town hosts the finish of the first stage of the cycling race Gracia–Orlová.

Sights

The landmark of Štramberk is a remnant of the Štramberk Castle, a cylindrical castle tower called Trúba. It was repaired in 1903–1904 and adapted to an observation tower. The town fortifications have been partially preserved and delimit the original town limits. From the Gothic Church of St. Bartholomew, which stood under the castle, only a prismatic brick bell tower with a wooden gallery has been preserved.

In the historic centre of Štramberk is a unique collection of timbered houses from the 18th and 19th centuries. The Baroque parish Church of Saint John of Nepomuk is the landmark of the town square. It was founded in 1721 and  decorated by Jano Köhler in the early 20th century.

The Šipka Cave is freely accessible.

Notable people
Martin Stephan (1777–1846), pastor of St. John Lutheran Church in Dresden
Zdeněk Burian (1905–1981), painter; lived here in 1905–1909
Jiří Hanzelka (1920–2003), traveller and writer

References

External links

Tourist Information Centre Štramberk

Cities and towns in the Czech Republic
Populated places in Nový Jičín District